Dichomeris dysorata is a moth in the family Gelechiidae. It was described by Turner in 1919. It is found in Australia, where it has been recorded from New South Wales.

The forewings are grey with slight fuscous irroration. The stigmata is very obscure, the plical beyond the first discal. There is an additional median dot, and another beneath the second discal. There is a series of blackish dots, one before the apex, one at the apex, and several on the termen. The hindwings are pale-grey.

References

Moths described in 1919
dysorata